Silakbo is a 1995 Philippine action crime film directed by Joel Lamangan. The film stars Cesar Montano, Alice Dixson, Anjanette Abayari, Marjorie Barretto and Joko Diaz.

Cast
 Cesar Montano as Andy Gil
 Alice Dixson as Barbara "Bang" Briones
 Anjanette Abayari as Tin Roman
 Marjorie Barretto as Cherry Acosta
 Joko Diaz as Rudy
 Robert Arevalo as Greg Macaspac
 Rey PJ Abellana as David Natividad
 Alicia Alonzo as Lolit Zacarias' Mother
 Dan Fernandez as Mario Felix
 Renato del Prado as Mang Pete
 Jim Pebanco as Young Executive
 Alma Lerma as Landlady
 Pocholo Montes as Attorney
 Michelle Parton as Lolit Zacarias
 Chiqui Pineda as Singer
 Manding Fernandez as Dirty Old Man
 Glydel Mercado as Chiqui
 Dante Javier as Dante

Production
The initial cut of the film included a scene where a private part of Anjanette Abayari was shown while she was dancing. When director Joel Lamangan refused to remove that scene during post-production, Abayari consulted a lawyer. When the film was submitted to the Movie and Television Review and Classification Board for review, the board ruled in favor of Abayari and that scene was excluded on the final cut of the film.

References

External links

1995 films
1995 action films
Filipino-language films
Philippine action films
Viva Films films
Films directed by Joel Lamangan